Ilia (Iliya Georgiyevich), also known as Elizbar (ელიზბარი), (2 September 1790 – 18 July 1854) was a Georgian prince royal (batonishvili), a son of George XII, the last king of Kartli and Kakheti, by his second marriage to Mariam Tsitsishvili. After the Russian annexation of Georgia in 1801, Ilia accompanied his mother into exile to Russia. He then received military training and served in the Russian army, fighting with distinction at the battle of Borodino against the French in 1812 and retiring with the rank of colonel in 1823. He had 13 children of his marriage with Princess Anastasia Obolenskaya and his descendants, bearing the surname of Gruzinsky, have survived in the 21st-century Russian Federation.

Biography  
Prince Ilia was born in Tbilisi in 1790 as the fifth child of the then-crown prince George and his second wife Princess Mariam Tsitsishvili in the lifetime of his grandfather, King Heraclius II. Ilia was 10 years old when his father died in December 1800 after two years of a troubled reign. In the ensuing succession crisis, Ilia's elder half brother and regent for the vacant throne, David, vied with Heraclius II's son, Iulon. The situation was exploited in 1801 by the Russian Empire to make annexation of Kartli and Kakheti, the eastern Georgian kingdom, followed by the deportation of the Georgian royal family to Russia proper. In 1803 Ilia himself witnessed the killing of the Russian general Ivan Lazarev by his mother, Queen Dowager Mariam, when Lazarev tried to force her out of her bedroom for resettlement in Russia. Mariam and her children were eventually deported to Russia, where Mariam was confined to a monastery. Ilia was accepted in the Page Corps for military training.

Prince Ilia, known in Russia as the tsarevich Ilya Georgyevich, was commissioned in March 1812 as a podporuchik of the Jäger Guards Regiment, with which he served in the war with Napoleon's Grande Armée. Under the command of Major-General Karl von Bistram, he fought at Smolensk and was marked for distinction at Borodino. In September 1812 illness forced him to retire from active service to Moscow. During the 1813–14 campaign he served in the Reserve Army of General Dmitry Lobanov-Rostovsky in the vicinity of the besieged French fortress of Modlin in Poland. In 1823 Prince Ilia was transferred to the Izmailov Guards Regiment with the promotion to colonel. He retired with that rank the same year.

Prince Ilia mostly lived in Moscow. In 1832, the Russian government revealed that Georgian nobles and intellectuals plotted a coup against the Russian overlordship. Among the principal leaders of the conspiracy was Ilia's brother Prince Okropir, living in St. Petersburg. Although one of the numbers, Philadelphos Kiknadze, testified on interrogation that Prince Ilia was also present when Okropir discussed the Georgian affairs with him, Ilia was never brought to a trial or otherwise persecuted. While living in Russia, like many of his siblings and relatives, Ilia showed interest in literature. In 1844, he translated from French into Georgian the Leibniz–Clarke correspondence as „ბაასი ორთა უჩინებულესთა ფილოსოფთა ევროპიისათა კლარკ და ლეიბნიცისა“ ("The conversation between the two preeminent philosophers of Europe, Clarke and Leibniz"). He died in Moscow at the age of 64 in 1854 and was interred at the Intercession Monastery.

Family and descendants  
Prince Ilia married at Moscow in 1827 Princess Anastasia Grigoryevna Obolenskaya (Анастасия Григорьевна Оболенская; 25 September 1805 – 3 March 1885), a Muscovite noblewoman of a Rurikid stock. She is buried with her husband at the Intercession Monastery. The couple had 13 children, titled as princes and princesses (knyaz) Gruzinsky, with the addition of the style "Serene Highness" since 1865.

Prince Ilia's surviving male-line descendants are through his son, Prince Grigoriy Gruzinsky, whose great-grandchildren reside in Russia. The only living male member of the line is the Moscow-born Evgeny Petrovich Gruzinsky (born 1947), a son of the Soviet naval officer Pyotr Petrovich Gruzinsky (1916–2006) by his wife Raisa Sergeyevna Yasinkov-Maletskaya (1923–1987). Based on the principle of primogeniture practiced by the Georgian royal family, he can be considered heir presumptive to Prince Nugzar Bagration-Gruzinsky, a scion of Ilia's elder brother Bagrat, who claims headship of the Royal House of Georgia and has no son.

The children of Prince Ilia and Princess Anastasia were:

Ancestry

Notes

References  
 
 
 
 
 

1790 births
1854 deaths
Bagrationi dynasty of the Kingdom of Kartli-Kakheti
Georgian princes
Military personnel from Tbilisi
Military personnel  from Moscow
Translators from Georgia (country)
18th-century people from Georgia (country)
19th-century people from Georgia (country)
Russian military personnel of the Napoleonic Wars
Royalty from Moscow